The National Engineering School of Sfax or ENIS, is a Tunisian engineering school and research establishment based in the city of Sfax located in the east of the country. It is a part of the University of Sfax.

Establishment
The National Engineering School of Sfax was founded in 1983.

Departments  
The National Engineering School of Sfax has seven independent departments: 
 Biological engineering 
 Civil engineering
 Electrical engineering
 Computer engineering and applied mathematics
 Geology
 Materials Engineering 
 Mechanical engineering

See also 
 National Engineering School of Tunis
 National Engineering School of Monastir
 National Engineering School of Sousse
 National Engineering School of Bizerte
 National Engineering School of Gabès
 National Engineering School of Gafsa
 National Engineering School of Carthage
 University of Sfax

References

External links 
 Official website

Universities in Tunisia
1983 establishments in Tunisia